The Salmon River is a river on Moresby Island in the Haida Gwaii archipelago of the North Coast of British Columbia, Canada, flowing northeast into McEchran Cove.

See also
Salmon River (disambiguation)

References

Rivers of Haida Gwaii